The Norway women's cricket team toured Sweden in August 2021 to play a three-match bilateral Twenty20 series, with the last of the matches having official Women's Twenty20 International (WT20I) status. The matches were played at the Guttsta Wicked Cricket Ground in Kolsva, and the official WT20I match was the first played by Sweden. On the first day of the tour, both teams shared a training day with Sweden's head coach Jonty Rhodes. Sweden won all three games in the series, including a low-scoring 2-wicket victory in their maiden WT20I.

Squads

WT20 series

1st unofficial WT20

2nd unofficial WT20

3rd WT20 (Only WT20I)

Notes

References

External links
 Series home at ESPN Cricinfo

Associate international cricket competitions in 2021